The Ba Na dwarf gecko (Hemiphyllodactylus banaensis) is a species of gecko. It is endemic to Vietnam.

References

Hemiphyllodactylus
Reptiles described in 2014
Endemic fauna of Vietnam
Reptiles of Vietnam